Sinsŏngch'ŏn station is a railway station located in Sinsŏngch'ŏn-rodongjagu, Sŏngch'ŏn County, South P'yŏngan Province, North Korea, on the P'yŏngra Line of the Korean State Railway; it is also the starting point of the P'yŏngdŏk Line.

History
The station was opened by the Chosen Government Railway on 1 October 1931, as part of the fourth section of the P'yŏngwŏn Line; it became part of the P'yŏngra Line after the establishment of the DPRK.

References

Railway stations in North Korea